Jayne Mansfield (born Vera Jayne Palmer; April 19, 1933 – June 29, 1967) was an American actress, singer, nightclub entertainer, and Playboy Playmate. A sex symbol of the 1950s and early 1960s while under contract at 20th Century Fox, Mansfield was known for her well-publicized personal life and publicity stunts. Her film career was short-lived, but she had several box-office successes and won a Theatre World Award and a Golden Globe Award.

Mansfield enjoyed success in the role of fictional actress Rita Marlowe in the Broadway play Will Success Spoil Rock Hunter? (1955–1956), which she reprised in the film adaptation of the same name (1957). Her other film roles include the  musical comedy The Girl Can't Help It (1956), the drama The Wayward Bus (1957), the neo-noir Too Hot to Handle (1960), and the sex comedy Promises! Promises! (1963); the latter established Mansfield as the first major American actress to perform in a nude scene in a post-silent era film.

Mansfield took her professional name from her first husband, public relations professional Paul Mansfield. She married three times, each marriage ending in divorce, and had five children. She was allegedly intimately involved with numerous men, including Robert and John F. Kennedy, her attorney Samuel S. Brody, and Las Vegas entertainer Nelson Sardelli. On June 29, 1967, she died in an automobile crash in New Orleans at the age of 34.

Early life
Jayne Mansfield was born Vera Jayne Palmer on April 19, 1933, at Bryn Mawr Hospital in Bryn Mawr, Pennsylvania the only child of Herbert William Palmer, of English and German ancestry, and Vera Jeffrey (née Palmer) Palmer, of English and Cornish descent. She inherited more than $90,000 from her maternal grandfather, Thomas ($ in  dollars), and more than $36,000 from her maternal grandmother, Beatrice Mary Palmer, in 1958 ($ in  dollars).

Palmer spent her early childhood in Phillipsburg, New Jersey, where her father was an attorney practicing with future New Jersey governor Robert B. Meyner. In 1936, her father died of a heart attack. In 1939, Palmer's mother married sales engineer Harry Lawrence Peers and the family moved to Dallas, Texas, where she was known as Vera Jayne Peers. As a child, she wanted to be a Hollywood star like Shirley Temple. At age 12, Palmer took ballroom dance lessons. She graduated from Highland Park High School in 1950. While in high school, Palmer took violin, piano, and viola lessons. She also studied Spanish and German. Palmer received grades in the high Bs in all subjects consistently.

At age 17, she married Paul Mansfield on May 6, 1950. Their daughter, Jayne Marie Mansfield, was born six months later, on November 8, 1950. Jayne and her husband enrolled in Southern Methodist University to study acting. In 1951, Jayne moved to Los Angeles and attended a summer semester at UCLA. She entered the Miss California contest but Paul found out and forced her to withdraw from the competition. She then moved to Austin, Texas, with her husband, and studied dramatics at the University of Texas at Austin. There, Mansfield worked as a nude art model, sold books door-to-door, and worked as a receptionist at a dance studio. She also joined the Curtain Club, a campus theatrical society that included lyricist Tom Jones, composer Harvey Schmidt, and actors Rip Torn and Pat Hingle among its members. Mansfield then spent a year at Camp Gordon, Georgia (a US Army training facility), when Paul Mansfield served in the United States Army Reserve in the Korean War.

In 1953, she moved back to Dallas and studied acting for several months under Baruch Lumet, the father of director Sidney Lumet and founder of the Dallas Institute of Performing Arts. Lumet gave Mansfield private lessons and called Mansfield and Rip Torn his "kids". Eventually, Lumet helped Jayne get her first screen test at Paramount in April 1954. Paul, Jayne, and Jayne Marie moved to Los Angeles in 1954. Jayne worked at a variety of odd jobs including: selling popcorn at the Stanley Warner Theatre, teaching dance, selling candy at a movie theater, modeling part-time at the Blue Book Model Agency, and working as a photographer at Esther Williams' Trails Restaurant.

Career

Playboy

While attending the University of Texas at Austin, Mansfield won several beauty contests, including Miss Photoflash, Miss Magnesium Lamp, and Miss Fire Prevention Week. By her own account, the only title she refused was Miss Roquefort Cheese, because she believed it "just didn't sound right". Jayne later also rejected "Miss Prime Rib" in 1957. In 1952, while in Dallas, she and Paul Mansfield participated in small local-theater productions of The Slaves of Demon Rum and Ten Nights in a Barroom, and Anything Goes in Camp Gordon, Georgia. After he left for military service, she made her first significant stage appearance in a production of Arthur Miller's Death of a Salesman on October 22, 1953, with the players of the Knox Street Theater, headed by Lumet. While at UCLA, she entered the Miss California contest (hiding her marital status), and won the local round before withdrawing.

Early in her career, some advertisers considered her prominent breasts undesirable, which led to her losing her first professional assignment – a commercial for General Electric that depicted young women in bathing suits relaxing around a pool. Emmeline Snively, head of the Blue Book Model Agency, had sent her to photographer Gene Lester, which led to her short-lived assignment in the General Electric commercial. In 1954, she auditioned at both Paramount Pictures and Warner Bros. At Paramount, Jayne performed a sketch she had worked out with Lumet from Joan of Arc for casting director Milton Lewis. Lewis informed her that she was wasting her "obvious talents" and had her come back a week later to perform the piano scene from The Seven Year Itch. Jayne failed to impress but learned she would have to go blonde. She then performed the piano scene for Warner Brothers, but, again, failed to impress. She landed her first acting assignment in Lux Video Theatre, a series on CBS in the episode "An Angel Went AWOL", aired on October 21, 1954. In it, she sat at a piano and delivered a few lines of dialogue for $300 ($ in  dollars).

In December 1953, Hugh Hefner began publishing Playboy. The magazine became a success, in part, because of early appearances from Mansfield, Marilyn Monroe, Bettie Page, and Anita Ekberg. In February 1955, Mansfield was the Playboy Playmate of the Month, and appeared in the magazine several times. Her February appearance increased the magazine's circulation and helped boost Mansfield's career.  Shortly afterward, she posed for the Playboy calendar, covering her breasts with her hands. Playboy featured Mansfield each February from 1955 to 1958, and again in 1960.

In August 1956, Paul Mansfield sought custody of his daughter, alleging that Jayne was an unfit mother because she appeared nude in Playboy. In 1964, the magazine repeated the 1955 pictorial. Playboy reprinted photos from that pictorial issue, with titles such as December 1965's "The Playboy Portfolio of Sex Stars",  and January 2000s "Centerfolds of the Century".

Film
Mansfield's first film part was a supporting role in Female Jungle, a low-budget drama completed in ten days. Her part was filmed over a few days, and she was paid $150 ($ in  dollars). It was released unofficially in early 1955. In February 1955, James Byron, her manager and publicist, negotiated a seven-year contract with Warner Brothers, who were intrigued by her publicity antics. The contract initially paid her $250 a week ($ in  dollars) and landed her two films – one with an insignificant role and another unreleased for two years. She filed for separation from Paul Mansfield that January. Mansfield was given bit parts in Pete Kelly's Blues (1955), starring Jack Webb, and Hell on Frisco Bay (1955), starring Alan Ladd. She acted in one more movie for Warner Brothers – another small but significant role opposite Edward G. Robinson in the courtroom drama Illegal (1955).

Mansfield's agent, William Shiffrin, signed her to play fictional film star Rita Marlowe in the Broadway play Will Success Spoil Rock Hunter? with Orson Bean and Walter Matthau. She accepted the part while working in producer Louis W. Kellman's The Burglar (1957), director Paul Wendkos's film adaptation of David Goodis' novel, made in film noir style. Mansfield appeared alongside Dan Duryea and Martha Vickers. It  was released two years later, when Mansfield's fame was at its peak. She was successful in this straight dramatic role, though most of her subsequent film appearances were comedic or capitalized on her sex appeal. It was Kellman's first major venture, and he claimed to have "discovered" Mansfield. She was announced for Will Success Spoil Rock Hunter? in mid-July 1955 and was dropped by Warner Brothers on July 31.Twentieth Century-Fox signed Mansfield to a six-year contract on May 3, 1956, in its New York office to mold her as a successor to the increasingly difficult Marilyn Monroe, their resident blonde sex symbol, who had just completed the very difficult Bus Stop. Mansfield was still under contract to Broadway and continued playing Will Success Spoil Rock Hunter? on stage until September 15, 1956. She undertook her first starring film role as Jerri Jordan in Frank Tashlin's The Girl Can't Help It (1956). Originally titled Do-Re-Mi, it featured a high-profile cast of contemporary rock and roll and R&B artists including Gene Vincent, Eddie Cochran, Fats Domino, The Platters and Little Richard. Released in December 1956, The Girl Can't Help It became one of the year's biggest successes, both critically and financially, earning more than Gentlemen Prefer Blondes had three years before. Soon afterward, Fox started promoting Mansfield as "Marilyn Monroe king-sized", attempting to coerce Monroe to return to the studio and complete her contract. Mansfield next played a dramatic role in  The Wayward Bus (1957), an adaptation of John Steinbeck's novel of the same name. With this film, she attempted to move away from her "blonde bombshell" image and establish herself as a serious actress. The film enjoyed moderate box-office success, and Mansfield won a Golden Globe in 1957 for New Star of the Year, beating Carroll Baker and Natalie Wood for her performance as a "wistful derelict". It was "generally conceded to have been her best acting", according to The New York Times, in a fitful career hampered by her flamboyant image, distinctive voice ("a soft-voiced coo punctuated with squeals"), voluptuous figure and limited acting range. Tashlin cast Mansfield in the film version of the Broadway show Will Success Spoil Rock Hunter?, released in 1957, reprising her role of Rita Marlowe alongside costars Tony Randall and Joan Blondell. Fox launched its new blonde bombshell with a North American tour and a 40-day, 16-country tour of Europe. She attended the premiere of the film (released as Oh! For a Man in the UK) in London, and met Queen Elizabeth II.

Mansfield's fourth starring role in a Hollywood film was in Kiss Them for Me (also 1957), for which she received prominent billing alongside Cary Grant. However, in the film itself she is little more than comic relief; Grant's character relates to a redhead played by fashion model Suzy Parker. The film, described as "vapid" and "ill-advised", was a critical and box-office flop, and marked one of the last attempts by 20th Century-Fox to publicize Mansfield. The continuing publicity surrounding Mansfield's physical appearance failed to sustain her career. Fox gave her a leading role opposite Kenneth More in The Sheriff of Fractured Jaw (1958), a western comedy filmed on location in Spain. In the film, Mansfield's three songs were dubbed by singer Connie Francis. Fox released the film in the United States in 1959, and it was Mansfield's last mainstream film success. Columbia Pictures offered her a part opposite James Stewart and Jack Lemmon in the romantic comedy Bell, Book and Candle (1958), but she turned it down because she was pregnant. Fox then attempted to cast Mansfield opposite Paul Newman in Rally 'Round the Flag, Boys! (1958), his ill-fated first attempt at comedy.

With a decreased demand for big-breasted, blonde bombshells and an increasing negative backlash against her excessive publicity, Mansfield became a box-office has-been by the early 1960s, yet she remained a celebrity, still able to attract large crowds outside the United States by way of lucrative and successful nightclub acts.

Mansfield gained no major star role in film roles after 1959. She was unable to fulfill a third of her contract with Fox due to her reported "repeated pregnancies". Fox stopped viewing her as a major Hollywood star and started loaning her and her likeness out to foreign productions in England and Italy, respectively, until the end of her contract in 1962. Many of her English/Italian films are regarded obscure and some considered lost.

In 1959, Fox cast her in two independent gangster films shot in the United Kingdom: The Challenge and Too Hot to Handle, both released the following year. Both films were low-budget, and their American releases were delayed. Too Hot to Handle was not released in the United States until 1961 as Playgirl After Dark. The Challenge was released in 1963 as It Takes a Thief. In the United States, censors objected to a scene in Too Hot to Handle in which Mansfield, wearing silver netting with sequins painted over her nipples, appears nearly nude.

When Mansfield returned to Hollywood in mid-1960, 20th Century Fox cast her in It Happened in Athens (1962) with Trax Colton, a handsome newcomer Fox was trying to mold into a heartthrob. She received first billing above the title but appeared in only a supporting role. The Olympic Games-based film was shot in Greece in the fall of 1960 but was not released until June 1962. It was a box-office failure, and 20th Century Fox dropped Mansfield's contract. In 1961, Mansfield signed on for a minor role but above-the-title billing in The George Raft Story, released the following year. Starring Ray Danton as Raft, the film showcased Mansfield in a small part as a glamorous film star. Soon after the film's release, she returned to European films, appearing in low-budget foreign films such as Heimweh nach St. Pauli (1963, Germany), L'Amore Primitivo (1964, Italy), Panic Button (1964, Italy) and Einer frisst den anderen (1964, Germany).

Tommy Noonan persuaded Mansfield to become the first mainstream American actress to appear nude in a starring role, in the film Promises! Promises! (1963). Playboy published nude photographs of Mansfield on the set in its June 1963 issue, resulting in obscenity charges against Hugh Hefner in a Chicago court. Promises! Promises! was banned in Cleveland, Ohio, but enjoyed box-office success elsewhere. As a result of the film's success, Mansfield landed on the Top 10 list of box-office attractions for that year. Soon after her success in Promises! Promises!, Mansfield was chosen from many other actresses to replace the recently deceased Marilyn Monroe in Kiss Me, Stupid (1964), a romantic comedy also starring Dean Martin. She turned down the role because of her pregnancy with daughter Mariska Hargitay, and was replaced by Kim Novak. That same year, Mansfield appeared in a pinup book called Jayne Mansfield for President: the White House or Bust, which was promoted on billboards; David Attie, a commercial and fine art photographer, took the photographs.

In 1966, Mansfield was cast in Single Room Furnished, directed by husband Matt Cimber. The film required Mansfield to portray three different characters, and was her first starring, dramatic role in several years. It was released briefly in 1966, but did not enjoy a full release until 1968, almost a year after her death. After Single Room Furnished wrapped, Mansfield was cast opposite Mamie Van Doren and Ferlin Husky in The Las Vegas Hillbillys (1966), a low-budget comedy from Woolner Brothers. It was her first country and western film, and she promoted it through a 29-day tour of major U.S. cities, accompanied by Husky, Don Bowman and other country musicians. Before filming began, Mansfield said she would not "share any screen time with the drive-in's answer to Marilyn Monroe", meaning Van Doren. Though their characters did share one scene, Mansfield and Van Doren filmed their parts at different times to be edited together later.

Mansfield's wardrobe relied on the shapeless styles of the 1960s to hide her weight gain after the birth of her fifth child. Despite career setbacks, she remained a highly visible celebrity during the early 1960s through her publicity antics and stage performances. In early 1967, Mansfield filmed her last role, a cameo in A Guide for the Married Man, a comedy starring Walter Matthau, Robert Morse and Inger Stevens. The opening credits listed Mansfield as one of the technical advisers, along with other star names.

Television

Mansfield played her first leading role on television in 1956 on NBC's The Bachelor. In her first appearance on British television in 1957, she recited from Shakespeare (including a line from Hamlet) and played piano and violin. Her notable performances in television dramas included episodes of Burke's Law, Alfred Hitchcock Presents, The Red Skelton Hour (three episodes), Kraft Mystery Theater and Follow the Sun. Mansfield's performance in her first series Follow the Sun ("The Dumbest Blonde"; Season 1, Episode 21; February 4, 1962; produced by 20th Century Fox Television) was hailed as the advent of "a new and dramatic Jayne Mansfield". She appeared on a number of game shows including "Talk it up," Down You Go (as a regular panelist), The Match Game (one rare episode has her as a team captain), and What's My Line? (as a special mystery guest).

She performed in a number of variety shows including The Jack Benny Program (on which she played violin), The Steve Allen Show and The Jackie Gleason Show (during the mid-1960s, when the show was the second-highest-rated program in the U.S.). In November 1957, in a special episode of NBC's The Perry Como Show ("Holiday in Las Vegas"), one of her nightclub acts was featured, something quite scandalous for the audience according to the broadcaster. She was a member of the headlining guests for three of The Bob Hope Specials. In 1957, she toured United States Pacific Command areas in Hawaii, Okinawa, Guam, Tokyo and Korea with Bob Hope for the United Service Organizations for 13 days appearing as a comedian; and in 1961, toured Newfoundland, Labrador and Baffin Island in Canada for a Christmas special. Her talk show career includes a large number of appearances which she appreciated for the publicity. One of her more notable appearances on a variety show was on The Ed Sullivan Show (Season 10, Episode 35; May 26, 1957) right after her success with Rock Hunter, where she played violin with a six-person backup band. After the show she exclaimed, "Now I am really national. Momma and Dallas see the Ed Sullivan show!"

By 1958, she earned $20,000 per episode for television performances ($ in  dollars). In 1964, Mansfield turned down the role of Ginger Grant on the up-and-coming television sitcom Gilligan's Island. Although her acting roles were becoming marginalized, Mansfield rejected the part as it epitomized the stereotype she wished to rid herself of. The part eventually went to Tina Louise. A widespread rumor that Mansfield had a breast-flashing dress mishap at the 1957 Academy Awards was found baseless by Academy researchers. Ten days before her death, she read To the Virgins, to Make Much of Time, a poem by Robert Herrick about early death on The Joey Bishop Show – her last television appearance.

As late as the mid-1980s, Mansfield remained one of the biggest television draws. In 1980, The Jayne Mansfield Story aired on CBS starring Loni Anderson in the title role and Arnold Schwarzenegger as Mickey Hargitay. It was nominated for three Emmy Awards. A+E Networks TV series Biography featured her in an episode titled Jayne Mansfield: Blonde Ambition. The TV series won an Emmy Award in the outstanding non-fiction TV series category in 2001. A&E again featured her life in another TV serial, Dangerous Curves, in 1999. In 1988, her story and archival footage was a part of the TV documentary Hollywood Sex Symbols.

Other ventures

Stage appearances

Between 1951 and 1953 she acted in The Slaves of Demon Rum, Ten Nights in a Barroom, Macbeth, and Anything Goes. Her performance in an October 1953 production of Arthur Miller's Death of a Salesman attracted Paramount Pictures to audition her. Lumet trained her for the audition. In 1955, she went to New York and appeared in the Broadway production of George Axelrod's comedy Will Success Spoil Rock Hunter?, also featuring Orson Bean and Walter Matthau. It was her first major stage performance, garnering her critical attention which was not always positive. She starred as Rita Marlowe (a wild, blonde Hollywood starlet à la Monroe) in the musical spoofing Hollywood in general and Marilyn Monroe in particular. Her wardrobe, namely a bath-towel, caused a sensation. She received a Theatre World Award (Promising Personality) for her performance in 1956, as well as a Golden Globe Award (New Star of the year, Actress) in 1957. Brooks Atkinson of the New York Times described the "commendable abandon" of her scantily clad rendition of Rita Marlowe in the play as "a platinum-pated movie siren with the wavy contours of Marilyn Monroe". She performed in about 450 shows between 1955 and 1956. At the time, she was considered one of the biggest Broadway-to-Hollywood success stories.

In 1964, she performed in stage productions of Gentlemen Prefer Blondes at Carousel Theater, and Bus Stop at Yonkers Playhouse. Both co-starred Mickey Hargitay and were well-reviewed. Mansfield toured small U.S. towns alternating between the two plays. In 1965, she performed in another pair of plays – Rabbit Habit at the Latin Quarter and Champagne Complex, directed by Matt Cimber, at the Pabst Theater; both  received poor reviews.

Nightclub

In February 1958, the Tropicana Las Vegas launched Mansfield's striptease revue The Tropicana Holiday (produced by Monte Proser, co-starring Mickey Hargitay) under a four-week contract that was extended to eight. The opening night raised $20,000 for March of Dimes ($ in  dollars). She received $25,000 per week for her performance as Trixie Divoon in the show ($ in  dollars), while her contract with 20th Century Fox was paying her $2,500 per week ($ in  dollars). She had a million-dollar policy with Lloyd's of London in case Hargitay dropped her as he whirled her around for the show. In 1959, Jayne returned to the Tropicana and made $30,000 per week, with her show being extended twice. In December 1960, the Dunes hotel and casino launched Mansfield's revue The House of Love (produced by Jack Cole, co-starring Hargitay). She received a salary of $35,000 a week ($ in  dollars) – the highest in her career.

Her wardrobe for the shows at Tropicana and Dunes featured a gold mesh dress with sequins to cover her nipples and pubic region. That controversial sheer dress was referred to as "Jayne Mansfield and a few sequins". In early 1963, she performed in her first club engagement outside Las Vegas, at the Plantation Supper Club in Greensboro, North Carolina, earning $23,000 in a week ($ in  dollars), and then at Iroquois Gardens in Louisville, Kentucky. She returned to Las Vegas in 1966, but her show was staged on Fremont Street, away from the Strip where the Tropicana and Dunes were. Her last nightclub act French Dressing was at the Latin Quarter in New York in 1966, also repeated at the Tropicana. It was a modified version of the Tropicana show, and ran for six weeks with fair success.

Her nightclub career became inspirations for films, documentaries, and a musical album. 20th Century Fox Records recorded "The House of Love" for an album entitled Jayne Mansfield Busts Up Las Vegas in 1962. She played the roles of burlesque entertainer Midnight Franklin in Too Hot to Handle (1960) and Las Vegas show girl Tawni Downs in The Las Vegas Hillbillys (1966). In 1967, an independent documentary Spree (alternative title Las Vegas by Night) on the antics of Las Vegas entertainers was released. The film, narrated as a part of a travelogue of Vic Damone and Juliet Prowse, featured Mansfield, Hargitay, Constance Moore and Clara Ward as guest stars. Mansfield strips and sings "Promise Her Anything" from the film Promises! Promises!. A court order prohibited using any of the guest stars to promote the film.

In her later career she was busier on stage, performing and making appearances with her nightclub acts, club engagements, and performance tours. By 1960, she made personal appearances for everything from supermarket promotions to drug store openings, at $10,000 per appearance ($ in  dollars).

Musical work 

Mansfield had classical training in piano and violin. She sang in film soundtracks, on stage for her theatrical and nightclub performances, and had singles and albums released. After her death, Mansfield became an inspiration for punk-rock musicians.

Soundtracks

Mansfield sang in English and German for a number of her films, including The Girl Can't Help It ("Ev'rytime" and "Rock Around the Rock Pile"), Illegal ("Too Marvelous for Words"), The Las Vegas Hillbillys ("That Makes It"), Too Hot to Handle ("Too Hot To Handle", "You Were Made For Me", "Monsoon" and "Midnight"), Homesick for St. Pauli ("Wo Ist Der Mann" and "Snicksnack Snuckelchen"), The Challenge ("The Challenge of Love"), The Sheriff of Fractured Jaw ("Strolling Down The Lane With Billy" and "If The San Francisco Hills Could Only Talk"), and Promises! Promises! ("I'm in Love", alternative title "Lullaby of Love").

Live performances
In 1958, an orchestra was recorded for the 31st Academy Awards ceremony with Jack Benny on first violin, Mansfield on violin, Dick Powell on trumpet, Robert Mitchum on woodwind, Fred Astaire on drums and Jerry Lewis as conductor; however, the performance was canceled. She sang "Too Marvelous for Words" for The Jack Benny Program ("Jack Takes Boat to Hawaii"; Episode 9, Season 14; November 26, 1963). Her club performances regularly featured songs like Call Me, A Little Brains, A Little Talent ("This Queen has her aces in all the right places"), Plain Jane, Quando-Quando, Bésame Mucho, and the song made famous by Marilyn Monroe – Diamonds Are a Girl's Best Friend.

Discography

In 1962, 20th Century Fox Records released the album Jayne Mansfield Busts Up Las Vegas, a recording of her Las Vegas revue The House of Love. In 1964 MGM Records released a novelty album called Jayne Mansfield: Shakespeare, Tchaikovsky & Me, in which Mansfield recited Shakespeare's sonnets and poems by Marlowe, Browning, Wordsworth, and others against a background of Tchaikovsky's music. The album cover depicted a bouffant-coiffed Mansfield with lips pursed and breasts barely covered by a fur stole, posing between busts of Tchaikovsky and Shakespeare. The New York Times described the album as a reading of "30-odd poems in a husky, urban, baby voice". The reviewer went on to remark that "Miss Mansfield is a lady with apparent charms, but reading poetry is not one of them."

In 1965, Jimi Hendrix played bass and added lead in his session musician days for Mansfield on two songs – "As The Clouds Drift By" and "Suey" – released as a 45-rpm single by London Records in 1966. Ed Chalpin, the record producer, claimed that Mansfield played all the instruments on the singles. According to Hendrix historian Steven Roby (Black Gold: The Lost Archives Of Jimi Hendrix, Billboard Books), this collaboration occurred because they shared the same manager. "Wo ist der Mann" sung in German and released by Polydor Records in Austria was much in demand immediately after its release in August 1963. The A-side featured Hans Last's "Snicksnack-Snuckelchen". The Original Sound label released two original songs from the soundtrack of The Las Vegas Hillbillys – "That Makes It" (an answer to The Big Bopper's "Chantilly Lace") on the A-side, and "Little Things Mean a Lot" on the B-side – in 1964.

Personal life
Mansfield had a daughter with her first husband, public relations professional Paul Mansfield.  She was the mother of three children from her second marriage to actor/bodybuilder Mickey Hargitay. She also had a son with her third husband, film director Matt Cimber.

Mansfield's son Zoltan made news when a lion named Sammy attacked him and bit his neck while he and his mother were visiting the theme park Jungleland USA in Thousand Oaks, California on November 23, 1966. He suffered from severe head trauma, underwent three surgeries at Community Memorial Hospital in Ventura, California, including a six-hour brain surgery, and contracted meningitis. He recovered, and Mansfield's attorney Sam Brody sued the theme park on the family's behalf for $1.6 million ($ million in  dollars). The negative publicity led to closure of the theme park.

In 1967, film critic and exploitation movie expert Whitney Williams wrote of Mansfield in Variety: "her personal life out-rivaled any of the roles she played". Mansfield was allegedly intimately involved with many men, including Claude Terrail (owner of the Paris restaurant Tour d'Argent), Robert F. Kennedy, John F. Kennedy, Brazilian billionaire Jorge Guinle, her attorney Samuel S. Brody, Las Vegas entertainer Nelson Sardelli, and producer Enrico Bomba. She met John F. Kennedy through his brother-in-law Peter Lawford in Palm Springs, California, in 1960, but their alleged affair did not last. Mansfield and Brody, her lawyer and alleged lover at the time, were both killed in a car crash.

Religion
In August 1963, Mansfield decided to convert to Catholicism. Although she never converted, she did attend Catholic services when she was in Europe, and followed Catholic practices when she was involved with a Catholic partner (including Hargitay, Sardelli and Cimber). In May 1967, her performance at the Mount Brandon Hotel in Tralee, Ireland, was canceled because Catholic clergy condemned it. She wanted to marry Cimber in a Catholic ceremony, but was unable to find a priest who would perform it. While involved with Brody, she also showed interest in Judaism.

In San Francisco for the city's 1966 Film Festival, Mansfield and Brody visited the Church of Satan to meet Anton LaVey, the church's founder. He awarded Mansfield a medallion and the title "High Priestess of San Francisco's Church of Satan". The media enthusiastically covered the meeting and the events surrounding it, identifying her as a Satanist and romantically involved with LaVey. That meeting remained a much-publicized and oft-quoted event both of her life and of the history of the Church of Satan. Karla LaVey asserted in a 1992 interview with Joan Rivers that Mansfield was indeed a practicing LaVeyan Satanist and that she had a romantic relationship with Anton LaVey.

Marriages

First marriage
Jayne met Paul Mansfield at a party on Christmas Eve in 1949; she was a popular student at Highland Park High School, and he at Sunset High School in Dallas. On May 6, 1950, they married in Fort Worth, Texas. At the time of their marriage, Jayne was 17 and three months pregnant; Paul was 20. While most major biographies put the date at May 6, some sources say the marriage was on May 10, 1950. According to biographer Raymond Strait, she had an earlier "secret" marriage on January 28, after which she conceived her first child. On November 8, 1950, Mansfield gave birth to her daughter, Jayne Marie Mansfield. Some sources cite Paul Mansfield as the father of her child, others allege that the pregnancy was the result of date rape.

Paul Mansfield hoped the birth of their child would discourage her interest in acting. When it did not, he agreed to move to Los Angeles in late 1954 to help further her career. In 1952, she juggled motherhood and classes at the University of Texas. Early in 1952, Paul was called to the United States Army Reserve for the Korean War. While he served in the army, she spent a year at Camp Gordon, Georgia. Her life became easier with Paul's army allotment. Returning from the Korean War in 1954, he took a job with a small newspaper in East Los Angeles, California, and lived in a small apartment in Van Nuys, Los Angeles, with Jayne and her pets – a Great Dane, three cats named Sabina, Romulus, and Ophelia, two chihuahuas, a poodle dyed pink, and a rabbit. While in California, she left Jayne Marie with her maternal grandparents and spent the summer semester at UCLA.

After a series of marital rows around Jayne's ambitions, infidelity, and animals, they decided to dissolve the marriage. It was a long process. In February 1955, Jayne filed for separate maintenance, and in August 1956, Paul filed for custody of their daughter, Jayne Marie. Jayne filed for divorce  in California in 1956, Paul filed for divorce in 1957 in Texas citing mental cruelty, and they received their divorce papers on January 8, 1958. After the divorce, she decided to keep "Mansfield" as her professional name. Paul Mansfield remarried, settled into the public relations business and moved to Chattanooga, Tennessee, but failed to win custody suits over Jayne Marie or restrain her from traveling abroad with her mother.

Following her 18th birthday, Jayne Marie complained that she had not received her inheritance from the Mansfield estate or heard from her father since her mother's death.

Second marriage

Mansfield met her second husband, Mickey Hargitay, at the Latin Quarter nightclub in New York City on May 13, 1956, where he was performing as a member of the chorus line in Mae West's show. Hargitay was an actor and bodybuilder who had won the Mr. Universe competition in 1955. Mansfield fell for him immediately, which resulted in a squabble with West. In the ensuing row, Mr. California, Chuck Krauser, beat Hargitay up and was arrested and released on a $300 bond ($ in  dollars).

After Mansfield returned from her 40-day European tour, Hargitay proposed to her on November 6, 1957, with a $5,000 10-carat diamond ring ($ in  dollars). On January 13, 1958 (days after her divorce from Paul was finalized), Mansfield married Hargitay at the Wayfarers Chapel in Rancho Palos Verdes, California. The unique glass chapel made public and press viewing of the wedding easy. Mansfield wore a sensational pink, skintight wedding gown made of sequins with a  flounce of pink tulle (designed by a 20th Century-Fox costume designer), and at the reception she had Hargitay drink pink champagne.

Hargitay made his first film appearance with Mansfield in a bit part in Will Success Spoil Rock Hunter?. The couple became a performing team touring in stage shows, where Mansfield's leopard-spot bikini became a topic of discussion and newspaper coverage. As a highlight, Hargitay tossed her around his waist and spun her in wide circles as her shows made more headlines. On screen, he was Mansfield's male lead in her Italian ventures – The Loves of Hercules and L'Amore Primitivo, and a major supporting character in Promises! Promises!. On stage, he was the male lead in The Tropicana Holiday, The House of Love, French Dressing, and other nightclub acts.

They made personal appearances on television shows such as the Bob Hope Specials. Mansfield and Hargitay had a number of business holdings, including the Hargitay Exercise Equipment Company, Jayne Mansfield Productions, and Eastland Savings and Loan. She co-wrote the autobiographical book Jayne Mansfield's Wild, Wild World with Hargitay. The book also contained 32 pages of black-and-white photographs from the film printed on glossy paper.

In 1962, she had a well-publicized affair with Enrico Bomba, the Italian producer and production manager of her film Panic Button. Hargitay accused Bomba of sabotaging their marriage. In 1963, she had another well-publicized relationship with singer Nelson Sardelli, whom she said she planned to marry when her divorce from Mickey Hargitay was finalized. The couple divorced in Juarez, Mexico, in May 1963, where Nelson Sardelli accompanied Mansfield in her legal preparations. She had previously filed for divorce on May 4, 1962, but told reporters "I'm sure we will make it up." During the acrimonious divorce proceedings, the actress attempted to force a more favorable financial settlement by accusing Hargitay of kidnapping one of her children.

Mansfield discovered that she was pregnant after her divorce. Being an unwed mother would have endangered her career, so she and Hargitay announced that they were still married. Mariska Hargitay was born January 23, 1964, after the actual divorce but before California ruled it valid.  Mansfield sued to get the Juarez divorce declared legal after Mariska was born, and the divorce was recognized on August 26, 1964. A court decree in June 1967 made Hargitay the guardian of Mickey, Zoltan, and Mariska, though they continued to live with Mansfield. He married airline stewardess Ellen Siano in 1968, and she accompanied him to New Orleans when he picked up his three children after Mansfield's death. Shortly after her funeral, Hargitay sued his former wife's estate for more than $275,000 ($ million in  dollars) to support the children, as he and his wife Ellen would raise them, but he lost the suit. Mansfield had once told Hargitay on a television talk show that she was sorry for all the trouble that she had given him.

Third marriage

Mansfield became involved with Matt Cimber (a.k.a. Matteo Ottaviano, né Thomas Vitale Ottaviano), an Italian-born film director, when he directed her in a stage production of Bus Stop in Yonkers, New York, costarring Hargitay. She married him on September 24, 1964, in Mulegé, Baja California Sur, Mexico. The couple separated on July 11, 1965, and filed for divorce on July 20, 1966. Cimber took over managing her career during their marriage, and guided her through a series of increasingly tawdry projects like Promises, Promises and The Las Vegas Hillbillys. Mansfield's marriage to Cimber began to collapse in the wake of her alcohol abuse, open infidelities, and her disclosure to Cimber that she had been happy only with her former lover, Nelson Sardelli. Work on Mansfield's film, Single Room Furnished directed by Cimber (1966), was suspended. The couple had one son, Antonio Raphael Ottaviano (a.k.a. Tony Cimber, born October 18, 1965).  Cimber, and his third wife dress designer Christy Hilliard Hanak, whom he married on December 2, 1967, raised Tony, Mansfield's youngest child. Cimber later worked as an announcer for Married... with Children and a producer for Gorgeous Ladies of Wrestling.

At the time, Mansfield had degenerated into alcoholism, drunken brawls, and performing at cheap burlesque shows. By July 1966, she started living with her attorney, Sam Brody, who had frequent drunken brawls with her and mistreated her eldest daughter, Jayne Marie. Sam's wife, Beverly Brody, filed for divorce, naming Mansfield the "41st other woman" in Sam's life.

Two weeks before her mother's death in 1967, 16-year-old Jayne Marie accused Sam Brody of beating her. The girl's statement to officers of the Los Angeles Police Department the following morning implicated her mother in encouraging the abuse, and days later a juvenile court judge awarded temporary custody of Jayne Marie to Paul's uncle William W. Pigue and his wife Mary.

Public image

Influence 

Mansfield was a major Hollywood sex symbol of the 1950s and early 1960s and 20th Century Fox's alternative to Marilyn Monroe. She came to be known as the "Working Man's Monroe". She was one of Hollywood's original blonde bombshells, and, although many people have never seen her movies, Mansfield remains one of the most recognizable icons of 1950s celebrity culture.

According to Hollywood historian and biographer James Parish, Mansfield's hourglass figure (she claimed dimensions of 40–21–35), unique sashaying walk, breathy baby talk, and cleavage-revealing costumes made an enduring impact. Hollywood historian Andrew Nelson said that she was seen as Hollywood's gaudiest, boldest, D-cupped, B-grade actress from 1955 until the early 1960s.

Frequent references have been made to Mansfield's very high IQ, which she claimed was 163. In addition to English, she spoke four other languages. She learned French, Spanish, and German in high school, and in 1963 she studied Italian. Reputed to be Hollywood's "smartest dumb blonde", she later complained that the public did not care about her brains saying, "They're more interested in 40–21–35 [a reference to her body measurements]."

Trademarks

Blonde
A natural brunette, Mansfield had her hair bleached, and colored platinum blonde when she moved to Los Angeles, and became one of the early "blonde bombshells", along with Marilyn Monroe, Betty Grable, and Mamie Van Doren. In 1958, she also had her eyebrows dyed platinum. Following Jean Harlow (who started the trend with her film Bombshell), Monroe, Mansfield, and Van Doren helped establish the stereotype typified by a combination of curvaceous physique, very light-colored hair, and a perceived lack of intelligence. A review of English-language tabloids shows it to be one of the most persistent blonde stereotypes – along with busty blonde, and blonde babe.

Mansfield and Monroe have been described as representations of a historical juncture of sexuality in comedy and popular culture. Academics also added Anita Ekberg and Bettie Page to the list of catalysts of the trend of exaggerated female sexuality, along with Mansfield and Monroe. M. Thomas Inge describes Mansfield, Monroe, and Jane Russell as personifications of the bad girl in popular culture. Judy Holliday and Goldie Hawn are also identified to have established the stereotype of the "dumb blonde", typified by their combination of overt sexuality, and apparent inability to understand everyday life. Instead of the asexualized and virginal "nice girls" of earlier films, the pneumatic blonde bombshells took over the screen in the 1950s to become a cult that has been consistently emulated from that era on. Social historian Joan Jacobs Brumberg described the 1950s as "an era distinguished by its worship of full-breasted women" and attributes the paradigm shift to Mansfield and Monroe. Patricia Vettel-Becker made that observation more specific by attributing the phenomenon to Playboy and Mansfield and Monroe's appearances in the magazine.

Anatomy
Newspapers in the 1950s routinely published Mansfield's body measurements, which once led  evangelist Billy Graham to exclaim, "This country knows more about Jayne Mansfield's statistics than the Second Commandment." Mansfield proclaimed a 41-inch bust line and a 22-inch waist when she made her Broadway debut in 1955, though some scholars dispute those figures. She was known as "the Cleavage Queen" and "the Queen of Sex and Bosom".

It was said that her breasts fluctuated in size from her pregnancies and nursing her five children. Her smallest bust measurement was 40-D (102 cm), which was constant throughout the 1950s, and her largest was 46-DD (117 cm), measured by the press in 1967. According to Playboy, her vital statistics were 40D-21-36 (102–53–91 cm) on her 5'6" (1.68 m) frame.

It has been claimed that her bosom was a major force behind the development of 1950s brassieres, including the whirlpool bra, cuties, the shutter bra, the action bra, latex pads, cleavage-revealing designs, and uplifted outlines. R. L. Rutsky and Bill Osgerby have claimed that it was Mansfield, along with Marilyn Monroe and Brigitte Bardot, who made the bikini popular. Drawing on the Freudian concept of fetishism, British science-fiction writer and socio-cultural commentator, J. G. Ballard commented that Mae West's, Mansfield's, and Monroe's breasts "loomed across the horizon of popular consciousness". According to Dave Kehr, as the 1960s approached, the anatomy that had made her a star turned her into a joke. In this decade, the female body ideal shifted to appreciate the slim waif-like features popularized by supermodel Twiggy, actress Audrey Hepburn, and others, demarcating the demise of the busty blonde bombshells.

Publicity
Mansfield's drive for publicity was one of the strongest in Hollywood. She gave up all privacy, and her doors were always open to photographers. On Christmas Eve 1954, she walked into publicist James Byron's office with a gift and asked him to oversee her publicity, which he did, for the most part, until the end of 1961. Byron appointed most of the people on her team – William Shiffrin (press agent), Greg Bautzer (attorney) and Charles Goldring (business manager) – and constantly planted publicity material in the media. She appeared in about 2,500 newspaper photographs, and had about 122,000 lines of newspaper copy written about her between September 1956 and May 1957.

Because of the successful media blitz, she achieved international renown. On October 10, 1959, she visited White Hart Lane, England, and watched the Tottenham Hotspur versus Wolverhampton Wanderers FC football match. By 1960, Mansfield had topped press polls for more words in print than anyone else in the world, had made more personal appearances than a political candidate, and was regarded as the world's most-photographed Hollywood celebrity. She made news on a regular basis, for malfunctioning dresses and clothing that burst strategically at the seams, to wearing low cut dresses without a bra. Things worsened when she took charge of her own publicity without advice. According to her agent William Shiffrin, "She became a freak." James Bacon wrote in the Los Angeles Herald-Examiner in 1973: "Here was a girl with real comedy talent, spectacular figure and looks and yet ridiculed herself out of business by outlandish publicity."

Mansfield received her first truly negative publicity after she and Hargitay pleaded poverty when his first wife, Mary Hargitay, whom he divorced on September 6, 1956, requested additional child support for their nine-year-old, first child, Tina, in September 1958. Mansfield said she slept on the floor of her mansion, was unable to buy furniture, and spent only $71 on her daughter Jayne Marie ($ in  dollars). During this marriage she had three children, Miklós Jeffrey Palmer Hargitay (born December 21, 1958), Zoltán Anthony Hargitay (born August 1, 1960), and Mariska Magdolna Hargitay (born January 23, 1964).

Publicity stunts
In January 1955, Mansfield appeared at a Silver Springs, Florida, press junket promoting the film Underwater!, starring Jane Russell. She purposely wore a too-small red bikini, lent to her by photographer friend Peter Gowland. When she dove into the pool for photographers, her top came off, creating a burst of media attention. The ensuing publicity led to Warner Bros. and Playboy approaching her with offers. On June 8 of the same year, her dress fell down to her waist twice in a single evening – once at a movie party, and later at a nightclub. In February 1958, she was topless at a Carnival party in Rio de Janeiro. She shimmied out of her polka-dot dress in a Rome nightclub in June 1962. In the three years since making her Broadway debut in Will Success Spoil Rock Hunter?, Mansfield had become the most controversial star of the decade.

In April 1957, her breasts were the focus of a publicity stunt intended to deflect media attention from Sophia Loren during a dinner party in the Italian star's honor. Photographs of them were published around the world. The best-known photo showed Loren's gaze falling on the actress's cleavage (she was seated between Loren and her dinner companion, Clifton Webb) when Mansfield leaned over the table, allowing her breasts to spill over her low neckline exposing one nipple. The Jayne Mansfield-Sophia Loren photograph  was a UPI sensation, appearing in newspapers and magazines with the word censored hiding the actress's exposed nipple.

At the same time, the world's media were quick to condemn Mansfield's stunts. One editorial columnist wrote: "We are amused when Miss Mansfield strains to pull in her stomach to fill out her bikini better; but we get angry when career-seeking women, shady ladies, and certain starlets and actresses ... use every opportunity to display their anatomy unasked." By the late 1950s, Mansfield began to generate a great deal of negative publicity because of repeated exposure of her breasts in carefully staged public "wardrobe accidents". Richard Blackwell, her wardrobe designer (who also designed for Jane Russell, Dorothy Lamour, Peggy Lee and Nancy Reagan), dropped her from his client list because of this. In April 1967, the Los Angeles Times wrote: "She confuses publicity and notoriety with stardom and celebrity and the result is very distasteful to the public."

Signature color

Mansfield adopted pink as her color in 1954, and was associated with it for the rest of her career. Her original choice was purple, but she thought it too close to lavender, Kim Novak's signature color. "It must have been the right decision," she said, "because I got more column space from pink than Kim Novak ever did from lavender." In November 1957, shortly before their marriage, using money from an inheritance, Mansfield bought the 40-room Mediterranean-style mansion (formerly owned by Rudy Vallée) at 10100 Sunset Boulevard in the Holmby Hills section of Los Angeles. Mansfield had the house painted pink, with cupids surrounded by pink fluorescent lights, pink fur in the bathrooms, a pink heart-shaped bathtub, and a fountain spurting pink champagne; she then dubbed it the "Pink Palace". Hargitay (a plumber and carpenter before taking up bodybuilding) built the pink heart-shaped swimming pool. The year after reconstructing the "Pink Palace" as a "pink landmark", she began riding in a pink Cadillac Eldorado Biarritz convertible with tailfins, then the only pink Cadillac in Hollywood.

Rivalry
Throughout her career, Mansfield was compared by the media to the reigning sex symbol of the period, Marilyn Monroe. 20th Century Fox groomed her, as well as Sheree North, to substitute for Monroe, their resident "blonde bombshell", while Universal Pictures launched Van Doren as their substitute. The studio launched Mansfield with a grand 40-day tour of England and Europe from September 25 to November 6, 1957. She adopted Monroe's vocal mannerisms instead of her original husky voice and Texas accent, performed in two plays that were based on Marilyn Monroe vehicles – Bus Stop and Gentlemen Prefer Blondes – and her role in The Wayward Bus was strongly influenced by Monroe's character in Bus Stop.

Other studios also tried to find their own versions of Monroe. Columbia Pictures tried it with Cleo Moore, Warner Bros. with Carroll Baker, Paramount Pictures with Anita Ekberg, and Metro-Goldwyn-Mayer with Barbara Lang, while Diana Dors was dubbed England's answer to Mansfield. Jacqueline Susann wrote, "When one studio has a Marilyn Monroe, every other studio is hiring Jayne Mansfield and Mamie Van Doren." The crowd of contenders also included Sheree North, Kim Novak, Joi Lansing, Beverly Michaels, Barbara Nichols and Greta Thyssen, and even two brunettes – Elizabeth Taylor and Jane Russell. Mamie Van Doren, Diana Dors and Kim Novak also acted in productions of Gentlemen Prefer Blondes. Even when Mansfield's film roles were drying up, she was still considered Monroe's primary rival. Mansfield considered Mamie Van Doren her professional nemesis. At one point, Monroe, Mansfield, and Mamie were known as The Three M's.

Death

In 1967, Mansfield was in Biloxi, Mississippi, for an engagement at the Gus Stevens Supper Club. After two appearances on the evening of June 28, Mansfield, Sam Brody (her attorney and companion), their driver Ronnie Harrison (age 20), and three of her children – Miklós, Zoltán, and Mariska – left Biloxi after midnight in a 1966 Buick Electra 225. Their destination was New Orleans, where Mansfield was to appear on WDSU's Midday Show the next day. The three adults in the front seat died instantly. The children, asleep in the rear seat, survived with minor injuries.

Reports that Mansfield was decapitated are untrue, although she suffered severe head trauma. This urban legend started with the appearance in police photographs of the crashed car with its top virtually sheared off, and what resembled a blonde-haired head tangled in the car's smashed windshield. However, Mansfield's death certificate, which states her immediate cause of death to be "crushed skull with avulsion of cranium and brain," rules this out. The identity of the head-like shape has not been definitively determined, but it is debated to have been either a wig that Mansfield was wearing or carrying, the top portion of her real hair and scalp, or "something else entirely." After her death, the National Highway Traffic Safety Administration recommended requiring an underride guard (a strong bar made of steel tubing) on all tractor-trailers; the trucking industry was slow to adopt this change. In America, the underride guard is sometimes known as a "Mansfield bar", or an "ICC bumper".

Mansfield's funeral took place on July 3 in Pen Argyl, Pennsylvania. The service was conducted by Charles Montgomery, a pastor of the Zion Methodist Church. A private funeral service was held at the chapel of the Pullis Funeral Home. A Methodist minister conducted her funeral ceremony. Mickey Hargitay was the only ex-husband present at the funeral. Mansfield was interred in Fairview Cemetery, southeast of Pen Argyl, beside her father Herbert Palmer.

In 1968, two wrongful-death lawsuits were filed on behalf of Jayne Marie Mansfield and Matt Cimber, one for $4.8 million ($ in  dollars) and the other for $2.7 million ($ in  dollars). The death car was saved by a private collector in Florida, where it became a roadside attraction in the 1970s. , the car is owned by Scott Michaels and is housed and shown at his Dearly Departed Tours & Artifact Museum in Los Angeles across from Hollywood Forever Cemetery.

Achievements and legacy

Awards and nominations 

 Jayne Mansfield received a Theatre World Award (Promising Personality) for Will Success Spoil Rock Hunter? in 1956.
 She received a Golden Globe Award (New Star of the year, Actress) for The Girl Can't Help It in 1957.
 She received a Star on the Hollywood Walk of Fame on February 8, 1960, for her contribution to motion pictures. 
 On Mother's Day of 1960, the Mildred Strauss Child Care Chapter of Mount Sinai Hospital, New York City declared her family as the "Family of the Year".
 Italian film, radio and television journalists awarded her the Silver Mask award in 1962.
 Mansfield received the Oscar of the Two World award in Italy.
 In 1963, Mansfield was voted one of the top-10 box-office attractions by an organization of American theater owners for her performance in Promises! Promises! (a film banned in parts of the U.S.).
 In 1968, the Hollywood Publicists Guild declared a "Jayne Mansfield Award" would be given to the actress who received the most exposure and publicity in a year. Raquel Welch was the first winner of the award in 1969.
 The airport on the remote Norwegian island Jan Mayen is named as a tribute and a pun 'Jan Mayensfield',

Legacy
Mansfield left behind five children and a crumbling estate,  including the Pink Palace. The 1991 US top 40 single "Kiss Them for Me" by the group Siouxsie and the Banshees and the L.A. Guns song "The Ballad of Jayne", are about Mansfield and her untimely death.

Her daughter Mariska Hargitay became an actress and star of Law & Order: Special Victims Unit. She has won several awards for her work on the show, including a Golden Globe Award for Best Actress in 2005, an Emmy Award for Outstanding Lead Actress in a Drama Series in 2006, and a People's Choice Award for the Drama TV Star of the Year in 2018.

Estate
After Mansfield's death, Hargitay, Cimber, Vera Peers (Mansfield's mother), William Pigue (Jayne Marie's legal guardian), and Charles Goldring (Mansfield's business manager), as well as Bernard B. Cohen and Jerome Webber (both administrators of the estate) filed unsuccessful suits to gain control of her estate. Mansfield's estate was appraised initially at $600,000 ($ million in  dollars), including the Pink Palace, estimated at $100,000 ($ in  dollars), a sports car sold for $7,000 ($ in  dollars), her jewelry, and Sam Brody's $185,000 estate left to her in his last will ($ in  dollars). In 1971, Beverly Brody sued the Mansfield estate for $325,000 ($ in  dollars) worth of presents and jewelry given to Mansfield by Sam Brody; the suit was settled out of court. However, her four eldest children (Jayne Marie, Mickey, Zoltan, and Mariska) went to court in 1977 to find that approximately $500,000 in debt that Mansfield had incurred ($ million in  dollars), including $11,000 for lingerie ($ in  dollars), $11,600 for plumbing of the heart-shaped swimming pool ($ in  dollars), and litigation had left the estate insolvent.

The Pink Palace was sold. Its subsequent owners included Ringo Starr and Engelbert Humperdinck. Cass Elliot is often falsely claimed to have owned the home. In 2002 Humperdinck sold it to developers, and the house was demolished in November of that year. What remained of her estate was subsequently managed by CMG Worldwide, an intellectual property-management company.

See also
 Jayne Mansfield performances
 Jayne Mansfield in popular culture
 The Jayne Mansfield Story
 Playboy
 List of people in Playboy 1953–1959
 List of people in Playboy 1960–1969

Notes

Citations

Biographies

Internet

Books
 Michael Feeney Callan (1986) Pink Goddess: The Jayne Mansfield Story. W H Allen.

External links

 
 Jayne Mansfield arrives in Houston in 1963 KPRC2 video from Texas Archive of the Moving Image
 
 
 
 
 
 
 

 
1933 births
1967 deaths
American film actresses
American people of Cornish descent
American people of English descent
American people of German descent
American stage actresses
American television actresses
Burials in Pennsylvania
New Star of the Year (Actress) Golden Globe winners
People from Bryn Mawr, Pennsylvania
People from Phillipsburg, New Jersey
1950s Playboy Playmates
Road incident deaths in Louisiana
University of Dallas alumni
University of Texas at Austin College of Fine Arts alumni
20th-century American actresses
20th Century Studios contract players
Original Sound artists
Articles containing video clips
UCLA Film School alumni
American LaVeyan Satanists
Southern Methodist University alumni
United Service Organizations entertainers